Carlos O. Lousto is a Distinguished Professor in the School of Mathematical Sciences in Rochester Institute of Technology, known for his work on black hole collisions.

Professional career
Lousto is a  Distinguished  Professor in the RIT's School of Mathematical Sciences and co-director of the Center for Computational Relativity and Gravitation. He holds two PhDs, one in Astronomy (studying accretion disks around black holes and the structure of neutron stars) from the National University of La Plata, and one in Physics from the University of Buenos Aires (on Quantum Field Theory in curved spacetimes), received in 1987 and 1992.

Carlos Lousto has an extensive research experience which ranges from observational astronomy to black hole perturbation theory and numerical relativity to string theory and quantum gravity. He has authored and co-authored over 150 papers 
, including several reviews and book chapters. His research is funded by NSF and NASA grants and supercomputing allocations in national labs.

Lousto is a key author of the breakthrough on binary black hole simulations and his research discovered that supermassive black holes can be ejected from most galaxies at speeds of up to 5000 km/s. He recently performed challenging simulations of small mass ratio black hole binaries up to 100:1 and at separations up to 100M and for flip-flopping black holes.
Lousto has designed the Funes (UTB), NewHorizon, BlueSky, and GreenPrairies (RIT) supercomputer clusters to perform binary black hole simulations and used them to support the first detection of gravitational waves from the merger of two black holes.

Distinctions

In 1991, Carlos Lousto was honored with an Alexander von Humboldt Foundation fellowship.

In 2006 and in 2016 his research was acknowledged in the US congressional records.

In 2012, Carlos Lousto was elected a Fellow of the American Physical Society "For his important contributions at the interface between perturbation theory and numerical relativity and in understanding how to simulate binary black holes".

2016 Special Breakthrough Prize in Fundamental Physics "For the observation of gravitational waves, opening new horizons in astronomy and physics".

2019 Edward A. Bouchet Award Recipient "For contributions to both numerical relativity, conducive to the solution of the binary black hole problem, and the understanding of the first detection of gravitational waves and service to the Hispanic scientific community, including the establishment of the Center for Gravitational Wave Astronomy, the University of Texas at Brownsville in 2003".

Selected bibliography

Highlights per year:

References

External links
  Radio Interview
  TV interview, P1,TV interview, P2

Year of birth missing (living people)
Living people
Argentine astrophysicists
Argentine mathematicians
Fellows of the American Physical Society
National University of La Plata alumni
People from Buenos Aires
Rochester Institute of Technology faculty
University of Buenos Aires alumni